Brosimum guianense, called snakewood, letterwood, leopardwood, and amourette, is a species of flowering plant in the genus Brosimum, native to southern Mexico, Central America, Trinidad, and tropical South America. A tree reaching , its heartwood can command a price of $30 per kg.

References

guianense
Flora of Southeastern Mexico
Flora of Southwestern Mexico
Flora of Veracruz
Flora of Central America
Flora of Trinidad and Tobago
Flora of northern South America
Flora of western South America
Flora of Brazil
Plants described in 1913
Flora without expected TNC conservation status